KYLV (88.9 FM, "K-LOVE") is a Christian Contemporary radio station serving the Oklahoma City, Oklahoma, area and is owned by Educational Media Foundation.

History
The station started in 1979 as a carrier current station on the campus of Oklahoma Christian University with the call letters KOCC (for Oklahoma Christian College.)  It went on the air in 1980 broadcasting Jazz and later Hot AC under the names K-ROCK 89 and PR89.  The station switched to the "K-LOVE" format in 1998.

The station has 3 translators in the vicinity as well.
 K265DT 100.9 - Chickasha, OK 92 watts
 K288FX 105.5 - North Enid, OK 250 watts
 K292FJ 106.3 - Stillwater, OK 250 watts

References

External links
KYLV station website

YLV
Contemporary Christian radio stations in the United States
K-Love radio stations
Radio stations established in 1979
1979 establishments in Oklahoma
Educational Media Foundation radio stations
YLV